Oran Tafaraoui Airport is a joint civil/military airport in Oran Province, Algeria .

History
During World War II, it was a primary mission objective of the United States Army 34th Infantry Division during the Allied Operation Torch landings on 8 November 1942, and became a major Twelfth Air Force base of operations during the North African Campaign against the German Afrika Korps.

Tafaraoui became a staging and transit point for many units:

 11–20 November 1942 - 1st Fighter Group HQ and the 27th, 71st and 94th Fighter Squadrons, flying P-38 Lightnings, arrived then departed Tafaraoui.
 14 November 1942 - HQ 14th Fighter Group, HQ 62d Troop Carrier Group, and the 4th and 7th Troop Carrier Squadrons arrive at Tafaraoui with C-47 Skytrains
 16 November 1942 - 8th Troop Carrier Squadron, 62d Troop Carrier Group, arrive at Tafaraoui from the UK with C-47s; the 111th and 154th Observation Squadrons, 68th Observation Group, moves from St Leu to Tafaraoui with A-20s
 17 November 1942 - 437th and 438th Bombardment Squadrons (Medium), 319th Bombardment Group (Medium), move from Saint-Leu to Tafaraoui with B-26s.
 November 42 - HQ 319th Bombardment Group (Medium) and the 439th, and 440th Bombardment Squadrons (Medium) move from St Leu to Tafaraoui with B-26 Marauders; "A" flight of the air echelon of the 15th Photographic Mapping Squadron, 3d Photographic Group, arrives at Tafaraoui with B-17 Flying Fortresses and F-4s (P-38 photo reconnaissance aircraft).

The new desert Spitfires of the 31st Fighter Group were also assigned to Tafaraoui. Other aircraft at the field included P-38s of the 14th, B-26s, B-25 Mitchells, A-20 Havocs, Gen. Doolittle's B-17-G, some French Amiot bombers around, and some old wrecks fixed up as dummies.

Current use
In 1966 the airport was established as an airbase and training ground for the Algerian Air Force.

References

 Maurer, Maurer. Air Force Combat Units of World War II. Maxwell AFB, Alabama: Office of Air Force History, 1983. .

External links

 

Airports in Algeria
Military of Algeria
Airfields of the United States Army Air Forces in Algeria
World War II airfields in Algeria
Buildings and structures in Oran Province